This is a list of programs currently, formerly, and soon to be broadcast by the Israeli Channel 2.

Currently broadcast by Channel 2

Channel 2 productions 

 Channel 2 prime time news (1993–present) – currently hosted by Yonit Levi
  (1993–present) – an investigative television program hosted by Ilana Dayan (broadcast on Telad and Keshet)
 Meet the Press (1996–present) – a weekly television news/interview program hosted by Rina Matzliah.
 Eretz Nehederet (2003–present) – a satirical entertainment show, featuring satirical references to current affairs of the past week through parodies of the people involved, as well as the thoughts of recurring characters. It is one of the most watched and influential shows on Israeli TV. It features a regular cast of comedians and actors, such as Eyal Kitzis, Tal Friedman, Mariano Idelman, Eli Finish, Orna Banai, Alma Zak, Dov Navon, Assi Cohen, Yuval Samo, Maor Cohen and Shani Cohen. (broadcast on Keshet)
 Ha-Olam Ha'Boker (2006–present) – morning show hosted by Avri Gilad and Hila Korach (broadcast on Reshet)
 Monit Hakesef (2007–present) – the Israeli version of Cash Cab, presented by Ido Rozenblum
 HaAh HaGadol (2008–present) – the Israeli version of Big Brother, hosted by Erez Tal and Assi Azar (broadcast on Keshet)
 HaMerotz LaMillion (2009–present) – Israeli version of the popular U.S. reality television game show The Amazing Race
 Matzav Ha'Uma (2010–2015) – a satirical entertainment show hosted by Lior Shline (broadcast on Reshet until 2015 and continue in Channel 10)
 The Voice Israel (2012–present) – reality television show searching for talented new vocalists; hosted by Michael Aloni (broadcast on Reshet)
 HaKokhav HaBa (2013–present) – reality television show searching for talented new vocalists, hosted by Assi Azar (broadcast on Keshet)
 Raid the Cage (2013–2014) – a game show hosted by Avi Kushnir (broadcast on Reshet)
 The X Factor Israel (2013–present): reality television show searching for talented new vocalists; hosted by Bar Refaeli (broadcast on Reshet)

Imported TV shows 
 Everybody Loves Raymond (repeats only)
 MasterChef Australia (2011–present)
 Sex and the City (repeats only)
 The Voice (2011–present)

Formerly broadcast by Channel 2

Channel 2 productions

Entertainment programs 
 Ha-Olam Ha'Erev (1990–1993)
 Hahamishia Hakamerit (1993–1997) – a weekly Israeli satirical sketch comedy program whose often surreal skits were characterized by a satirical point of view which did not spare the audience sensitive subjects such as politics, national security, the Holocaust and sex
 Fisfusim (1994–2008)
 Ha-Comedy Store (1994–1997) – a weekly entertainment program which consisted of different short nonsense-style skits
 Reshut HaBidur / Rishon Babidur (1994–2004) – talk show hosted by Dudu Topaz
 Zehu Ze Hai (1995–1998) – a weekly entertainment program which consisted of several short sketches
 Chartzufim (1996–1999) – an Israeli political satire television programme in the vein of Britain's Spitting Image
 Parpar Layla (1997–2000)
 Chalomot BeHakitzis (1998–2001)
 Rak Beyisrael (1998–2003)
 Shidurey HaMahapecha (2002)
 Mishak Makhur (2004–2006) – a comedy panel show
 Heichal Ha-Tarbut (2005–2006)
 Moadon Layla (2006–2007) – panel stand-up-like talk show

Sitcoms 
 Itche (1994–1997)
 Shemesh (1997–2004)
 Shotetut (2002–2003)
 Echad Ha'Am Echad (2003)
 Ramzor (2008–2014) – a comedy drama dealing with relationship issues from the men's point of view. Three friends are each in a different phase of their relationships. The married man is standing on the red light and can't move a finger without the approval of his control freak wife. The one having a stable relationship is standing on the yellow area which means his girlfriend keeps the leash very close to her, and his relative freedom is only an illusion. The single guy is running free on the highway of one-night stands. Each one of them gives a different interpretation for the terms of relationships between men and women through several comic situations. The show features Adir Miller, Lior Halfon, Nir Levy and Yael Sharoni. (broadcast on Keshet)

Reality and game shows 
 Let's Make a Deal (1994–1996) – the Israeli version of the popular U.S. game show
 Lingo (1994–1996) – the Israeli version of the U.S. game show of the same name
 The Price Is Right (1994) – the Israeli version of the popular U.S. game show
 Wheel of Fortune (1994–2000) – the Israeli version of the popular U.S. game show
 The Fortress (1998–1999) – the Israeli version of the popular French reality television game show Fort Boyard
 Who Wants to Be a Millionaire? (1999–2003) – the Israeli version of the popular U.S. game show
 The Vault (2000–2007)
 We Won't Stop Singing (2002–2005)
 Kokhav Nolad (2003–2012) – reality television show searching for talented new vocalists; hosted by Zvika Hadar (broadcast on Keshet)
 The Ambassador (2005–2006)
 Nolad Lirkod (2005–2008)
 Rokdim Im Kokhavim (2005–2012) – a reality television show featuring celebrities with professional dance partners competing in ballroom and Latin dances; hosted by Avi Kushnir and Hila Nachshon, who were replaced by Guy Zu-Aretz and Yarden Harel in the final series
 The Successor (2006) – an Israeli competition show judged by mystifier Uri Geller. The show featured ten contestants competing to become the next great mentalist, to be determined by viewers voting by phone and online. The contestants performed their effects on celebrity guests each week.
 1 vs 100 (2007–2013): game show hosted by Avri Gilad

TV series 
 Ramat Aviv Gimel (1995–2000)
 Hafuch (1996–1998)
 Kesef Katlani (1996–1999)
 Florentine (1997–1998)
 Tironoot (1998–2001) and its sequel Miluim (1998–2001)
 Zinzana (1999–2005)
 Ha-Burganim (2000–2004)
 Bnot Brown (2002)
 Ahava Me'ever Lapina (2003–2005)
 Esti HaMekho'eret (2004–2006)
 Ima'lle (2005–2008)
 A Touch Away (2007)

Current affairs shows 
 Live with Dan Shilon (1991–2000)
 Rafi Reshef (1996–2001)
 Pgisha Leylit (1996–2005)
 Reshet Al Ha'Boker (1996–2006)
 Shishi Va'Chetzi (1998–2003)
 Yair Lapid (2000–2007)
 Bulldozer (2004–2007)
 Shomer Masach (2005)

Youth shows 
 Yom Yoman (1991–1993)
 Boker Shel Keif (1993–1995)
 Chalom Alieychem (1993–1998)
 Disney Time (1993–2002)
 Joseph the Marrator (1994–1995)
 Michal's Carnival (1995–1997)
 Hachaverim shel Barney (1997–1999)
 Shoko Telad (1997–2002)
 Bravo (1998–2002)
 Ha-Sodot Shel Kineret (1998–1999)
 Mishpacha VaChetzi (1998–2001)
 Stagadam (1998–1999)
 Od Mishpacha VaChetzi (2008–2009)

Imported TV shows

References

Channel 2

Programs broadcast by Channel 2